Chiclete com banana may refer to:

Chiclete com Banana, an Axé music band
Chiclete com banana (song), a song by Jackson do Pandeiro